Henry Pelham  (25 September 1694 – 6 March 1754) was a British Whig statesman who served as 3rd Prime Minister of Great Britain from 1743 until his death in 1754. He was the younger brother of Thomas Pelham-Holles, 1st Duke of Newcastle, who served in Pelham's government and succeeded him as prime minister. Pelham is generally considered to have been Britain's third prime minister, after Robert Walpole and the Earl of Wilmington.

Pelham's premiership was relatively uneventful in terms of domestic affairs, although it was during his premiership that Great Britain experienced the tumult of the 1745 Jacobite uprising. In foreign affairs, Britain fought in several wars. On Pelham's death, his brother Newcastle took full control of the British government.

Early life
Pelham, Newcastle's younger brother, was a younger son of Thomas Pelham, 1st Baron Pelham, and his wife, the former Grace Pelham, Baroness Pelham of Laughton, the daughter of Gilbert Holles, 3rd Earl of Clare, and Grace Pierrepont. He was educated at Westminster School, and matriculated at King's College, Cambridge at Easter 1709, then migrated to Hart Hall, Oxford (the present-day Hertford College), matriculating on 6 September 1710, upon the appointment of his tutor Richard Newton as Principal of Hart Hall.

As a volunteer he served in Dormer's regiment at the Battle of Preston in 1715 and spent some time on the Continent. He was returned as Member of Parliament for Seaford in Sussex by his brother, the Duke of Newcastle, at a by-election on 28 February 1717 and represented it until 1722.

Career

Government
Through strong family influence, and the recommendation of Robert Walpole, he was chosen in 1721 as Lord of the Treasury. At the 1722 general election he was returned as MP for Sussex county. In 1724 he entered the ministry as Secretary at War, but this office he exchanged in 1730 for the more lucrative one of Paymaster of the Forces. He made himself conspicuous by his support of Walpole on the question of the excise. He, Newcastle, and the Prime Minister would often meet at Houghton Hall in Norfolk, where they would draw up much of the country's policy. These meetings became known as the Norfolk Congress. With Walpole, he served as a founding governor of the popular charity the Foundling Hospital when it opened its doors in 1739. Like his brother, the Duke of Newcastle, Pelham was an active freemason of the Premier Grand Lodge of England, active alongside John Theophilus Desaguliers.

In 1742 a union of parties resulted in the formation of an administration in which Pelham became Prime Minister the following year, succeeding the Earl of Wilmington after his death.

Prime Minister

The first year of Pelham's premiership is regarded as a continuation of the Carteret ministry, with Lord Carteret continuing as Secretary of State for the Northern Department with responsibility for foreign affairs; Carteret was close to King George II. Pelham served as First Lord of the Treasury, Chancellor of the Exchequer and Leader of the House of Commons.

In November 1744, the Pelhams forced Lord Carteret out of the ministry: Pelham bluntly told the king that either Carteret step down, or the Pelhamites would, leaving His Majesty without a government. Thereafter Pelham shared power with his brother, the Duke of Newcastle upon Tyne. Pelham was regarded as the leading figure, but rank and influence made his brother very powerful in the Cabinet.  In spite of a genuine attachment, there were occasional disputes between them, which sometimes led to further difficulties.

"The Broad-Bottomed Administration" 

Being strongly in favour of peace, Pelham carried on the War of the Austrian Succession with languor and indifferent success, but the country, wearied of the interminable struggle, was disposed to acquiesce in his foreign policy almost without a murmur. King George II, thwarted in his own favourite schemes, made overtures in February 1746 to Lord Bath, but his purpose was upset by the resignation of the two Pelhams (Henry and Newcastle), who, after a two-day hiatus in which Bath and Carteret (now earl Granville) proved unable to form a ministry, resumed office at the king's request.  One of their terms was to insist that the king should have 'total confidence' in a ministry; rather than partial grudging acceptance of the Whigs.

The Augustan era was essential to the development of prime ministerial power as being entirely dependent on a Commons majority, rather than royal prerogative interventions.  While the king struggled with his headstrong son, Frederick, Prince of Wales, his son's uncertain constitutional position was high in the Leicester House party set.  In 1748 Frederick, a Tory, planned to bring down the Pelhamites at a general election due the following year.  The Prime Minister called an early poll in 1748 by asking the king to dissolve parliament in 1747.  The prince and his father, the king grew to hate one another with unspeakable animosity.  But one consequence was a closer relationship between Henry Pelham and the Sovereign.  When he finally died in 1754, the King remarked "Now I shall have no more peace."  The Treaty of Aix-la-Chapelle had been signed in 1748 leading inexorably to a number of cost-cutting budgetary measures.

The Army and Navy spending shrunk from £12 m to £7 million per annum.  Pelham promised to reduce interest rates through introduction of a balancing act measure from 4% to 3% by 1757.  He also assisted a fund to reduce the National Debt. In 1749, the Consolidation Act was passed, reorganising the Royal Navy. On 20 March 1751, the British calendar was reorganised as well (New Year's Day became 1 January); Britain would adopt the Gregorian calendar one year later.  In 1752 he was able to reduce the land tax from 4 s. to 2 s in the pound (an effective reduction from 20% to 10%).

One social consequence of the press gangs going to sea in an expansive navy fleet was to the growth of industrial processes necessary for warfare.  In the ports the distillation of gin demonstrated clearly by engravers such as Hogarth in "Gin Lane" the depravity issuing forth from the demon drink.  Preachers' "fire and brimstone" in favour of temperance, and drunken soldiers and sailors persuaded the administration to introduce the Gin Acts.  The Gin Act 1751 was the last of four that had largely failed to prevent serious social unrest, including riots in London, reduced the number licensed dealers and sellers of liquor.  By restricting supply the consumption dropped and price fell helping to manage the problem.

Two of Pelham's final acts were the Jew Bill of 1753, which allowed Jews to become naturalized by application to Parliament, and the Marriage Act of 1753, which enumerated the minimum age of consent for marriage. Upon his death, his brother (the aforementioned Duke of Newcastle upon Tyne) took over government.

Achievements
His very defects were among the chief elements of Pelham's success, for one with a strong personality, moderate amount self-respect, or haughty conceptions of statesmanship could not have restrained the discordant elements of the cabinet for any length of time the way he did. Moreover, he possessed tact and a thorough acquaintance with the forms of the House of Commons. Whatever quarrels or insubordination might have existed within the cabinet, they never broke out into open revolt. His foreign policy followed Walpole's model of emphasizing peace and ending wars.  His financial policy was a major success once peace had been signed in 1748 to end the War of the Austrian Succession. He demobilized the armed forces, and reduced government spending from £12 million to £7 million.  He refinanced the national debt dropping the interest from 4% to 3%.  In 1752 he reduced the land tax from four shillings to two shillings in the pound; that is, from 20% to 10%. 
According to historians Stephen Brumwell and W.A. Speck, his:
subdued manner concealed a shrewd and calculating politician.  He was reserved and cautious, but behind the reserve was steel.  All agreed on his integrity, which was remarkable in a venal age; unlike Walpole, he died relatively poor."

Personal life
Pelham had married Lady Catherine Manners, daughter of the John Manners, 2nd Duke of Rutland, on 31 October 1726, at St James, Westminster, London. They had four daughters:
 Catherine Pelham-Clinton, Countess of Clinton (1727–1760), married 1744 Henry Clinton, 9th Earl of Lincoln, who by this marriage subsequently became the 2nd Duke of Newcastle-under-Lyme
 Frances (1728–1824), died unmarried
 Grace Watson, Baroness Sondes (1735–1777), married 1752 the Hon. Lewis Watson, who in 1760 was created Baron Sondes
 Mary (1739–1???), died unmarried

When Pelham was elevated to Prime Minister, he began construction of a house located at 22 Arlington Street in St. James's, a district of the City of Westminster in central London. He hired the architect William Kent to build the structure in two phases. Kent died in 1748 and the work was completed by Stephen Wright in 1754.

Pelham was buried in All Saints' Church, Laughton, East Sussex.

Pelham's personal papers were inherited by his son-in-law and now form part of the Newcastle (Clumber) Collection held at the department of Manuscripts and Special Collections, The University of Nottingham. Pelham was the first British Prime Minister who never acceded to the peerage in his lifetime.

Ancestry

In popular culture
Pelham was played by Roger Allam in the 2011 film Pirates of the Caribbean: On Stranger Tides.

Arms

Notes

References
 Ballantyne, Archibald. Lord Carteret: A Political Biography 1690 to 1763 (1887)  online
 Coxe, William, Memoirs of the administration of the Right Honourable Henry Pelham, collected from the family papers, and other authentic documents (2 vol. 1829) online
 Leonard, Dick. "Henry Pelham—Pragmatic Heir to Walpole." in Dick Leonard, ed. Eighteenth-Century British Premiers (Palgrave Macmillan UK, 2011) pp. 40–53.
 Marshall, Dorothy. Eighteenth Century England (2nd ed. 1974) political history 1714–1784,

 Williams, Basil. The Whig Supremacy: 1714-1760 (2nd ed. 1962).
Some material has been adapted from the 1911 Encyclopædia Britannica.
; cited as PelODNB.

External links
More about Henry Pelham on the Downing Street website.
Biography of Henry Pelham, with links to online catalogues, on the website of Manuscripts and Special Collections, The University of Nottingham

Prime Ministers of Great Britain
Chancellors of the Exchequer of Great Britain
Alumni of Hart Hall, Oxford
Alumni of King's College, Cambridge
Paymasters of the Forces
Members of the Privy Council of Great Britain
Members of the Parliament of Great Britain for English constituencies
People educated at Westminster School, London
Freemasons of the Premier Grand Lodge of England
Whig (British political party) MPs
People of the Jacobite rising of 1715
1694 births
1754 deaths
Burials in Sussex
18th-century heads of government
Leaders of the House of Commons of Great Britain
Fellows of the Royal Society
Henry
Younger sons of barons
War Office
People from Laughton, East Sussex